JSC Visor Capital is one of the largest investment banks of Kazakhstan. It has a headquarters in Almaty city and the representative branch in London (United Kingdom), Beijing (China) and Dubai (UAE), Moscow (Russia), Bishkek (Kyrgyzstan), and Tashkent (Uzbekistan). Visor Capital provides the full range of investment banking services and advice, including Corporate Finance, Sales & Trading, and Research, to domestic and international clients.

The Visor group’s track record includes investment banking transactions in Kazakhstan, Kyrgyzstan, Uzbekistan, Russia, and Belarus.

Management team 
 Michael Sauer — Founder & Chairman of the Board 
 Jose Luiz Gaviao — Managing Director, Head of Investment Banking
 Dominic Lewenz — Managing Director, Head of Research
 Stefano Resegotti — Managing Director, Head of Sales and Trading
 Mathias Wikberg — Managing Director, Head of Trading

Awards 
2013: EXTEL Surveys: nb.1 ranked in the category "Emerging EMEA / Frontier Markets (incl. Kazakhstan and Kyrgyzstan)"
2012: EXTEL Surveys: nb.1 ranked in the category "Emerging EMEA / Frontier Markets (incl. Kazakhstan and Kyrgyzstan)"
2011: EXTEL Surveys: nb.1 ranked in the category "Emerging EMEA / Frontier Markets (incl. Kazakhstan and Kyrgyzstan)"

References

External links 
 Visor Capital homepage

Investment banks